Aldborough may refer to:

Places
In Australia
 Aldborough, Charters Towers, a heritage-listed house in Queensland
In Canada
Aldborough Township, Ontario
 In Ireland
Aldborough House, a building in Dublin, Ireland
In United Kingdom
Aldborough, Norfolk
Aldborough, North Yorkshire
Aldborough Roman town
Aldborough (UK Parliament constituency)
Aldborough Hatch, in the London Borough of Redbridge
Aldborough, an electoral ward in the London Borough of Redbridge
Aldeburgh, a village in Suffolk where the Aldeburgh Festival takes place 
Aldbury, a village in Hertfordshire

People 
Earl of Aldborough, a title in the peerage of Ireland
Baroness of Aldborough (1693–1778), daughter of King George I of Great Britain
Richard Aldborough (1607–1649), English politician

Ships 
HMS Aldborough, the name of several Royal Navy vessels

See also

Aldbrough (disambiguation)
Aldeburgh, Suffolk